Venus International School is an educational institution in Bangalore, India.

The school focuses on leadership in all spheres. To achieve this, it follows a child-centered curriculum based on the Indian Certificate of Secondary Education (ICSE) pattern supplemented with co-curricular and extra-curricular programs.

From kindergarten until the student steps out, they are guided in their journey of discovery, exploration, enquiry and experimentation. The school provides a learning environment where a thirst for knowledge is nurtured.

The institution focuses on excellence whether in the class room, playfield, or extracurricular activities. In addition, the significance of moral values and empathy for the underprivileged is given equal importance. The school has carved a niche as one of the leading educational institutions. The upgrading of facilities is a continuous process and a top priority with the management.

Curriculum 

Montessori Classes to Standard 10

Events
Guinness world record – on Gandhi's jayanthi (2015), Venus students create a new world record
Yoga Day celebration day

References

External links

International schools in Bangalore
Educational institutions established in 1995
1995 establishments in Karnataka